Jake Carter may refer to:

 Jake Carter (basketball) (born 1924–2012), retired American basketball player
 Jake Carter (wrestler) (born 1986), American professional wrestler
 Jake Carter (singer) (born 1998), Irish singer
 Jake Carter, one of the main protagonists from The Marine franchise